Dante B. Canlas is a Filipino economist and a professor at the UP School of Economics at the University of the Philippines Diliman. He served as Socio-Economic Planning Secretary and concurrently Director-General of the National Economic and Development Authority from 2001 to 2002 under President Gloria Macapagal Arroyo. Dr. Canlas was also the Executive Director of the Asian Development Bank (ADB) for Kazakhstan, Maldives, Marshall Islands, Mongolia, Pakistan, and the Philippines from 2003 to 2004.

He earned his B.S. in mathematics, M.A. and Ph.D. in economics from the University of the Philippines, where he was a member of Upsilon Sigma Phi. He completed his dissertation "Marital Fertility and Working Wives in the Philippines: An Economic Analysis" in 1978. He was Visiting Professor at Northern Illinois University in De Kalb, Illinois and Research Fellow at the prestigious Princeton University in New Jersey.

References

 University of the Philippines School of Economics: Profile of Dr. Dante B. Canlas

20th-century Filipino economists
Living people
Directors-General of the National Economic and Development Authority of the Philippines
Arroyo administration cabinet members
University of the Philippines alumni
Academic staff of the University of the Philippines
Year of birth missing (living people)
21st-century Filipino economists